Discrete & Computational Geometry is a peer-reviewed mathematics journal published quarterly by Springer. Founded in 1986 by Jacob E. Goodman and Richard M. Pollack, the journal publishes articles on discrete geometry and  computational geometry.

Abstracting and indexing

The journal is indexed in:
 Mathematical Reviews
 Zentralblatt MATH 
 Science Citation Index
 Current Contents/Engineering, Computing and Technology

Notable articles

The articles by Gil Kalai with a proof of a subexponential upper bound on the diameter of a polyhedron and by Samuel Ferguson on the Kepler conjecture, both published in Discrete & Computational geometry, earned their author the Fulkerson Prize.

References

External links

Mathematics journals
Publications established in 1986
English-language journals
Springer Science+Business Media academic journals
Quarterly journals
Computational geometry
Discrete geometry